A bawn is the defensive wall surrounding an Irish tower house. It is the anglicised version of the Irish word bábhún (sometimes spelt badhún), possibly meaning "cattle-stronghold" or "cattle-enclosure". The Irish word for "cow" is bó and its plural is ba. The Irish word for "stronghold, enclosure" is dún, whose genitive case is ''dúin'".

The original purpose of bawns was to protect cattle from attack. They included trenches that were often strengthened with stakes or hedges. Over time, these were gradually replaced by walls. The name then began to be used for the walls that were built around tower houses.

English and Scottish names for the same thing include "pele" (hence pele tower) and "barmkin".

See also
Tower houses in Britain and Ireland
Curtain wall

References

External links
Bellaghy - Bawn

Fortification (architectural elements)